Miss Kobayashi's Dragon Maid is a Japanese manga series written and illustrated by Coolkyousinnjya. It began publishing in the first issue of Futabasha's Monthly Action magazine on 25 May 2013. Seven Seas Entertainment licensed the series in North America, and they released the first volume in October 2016.

Volume list

Miss Kobayashi's Dragon Maid

Miss Kobayashi's Dragon Maid: Kanna's Daily Life

Miss Kobayashi's Dragon Maid: Elma's Office Lady Diary

Miss Kobayashi's Dragon Maid: Lucoa is my xx

Miss Kobayashi's Dragon Maid: Fafnir the Recluse

References

Miss Kobayashi's Dragon Maid